Mounir Benmeddour (born 8 May 1988  in Algiers, Algeria) is an Algerian professional footballer. He currently plays as a goalkeeper of AS Khroub in the Algerian Ligue Professionnelle 2.

Statistics

References

External links
 

1988 births
Algerian footballers
Algerian Ligue Professionnelle 1 players
Algerian Ligue 2 players
Living people
AS Khroub players
Olympique de Médéa players
Paradou AC players
Footballers from Algiers
USM El Harrach players
USM Blida players
ESM Koléa players
RC Kouba players
Association football goalkeepers
21st-century Algerian people